Fortress Hill or Pau Toi Shan is a hill and an area on the north shore of Hong Kong Island, Hong Kong. Fortress Hill includes the western part of North Point lying west of Oil Street, and the eastern part of Causeway Bay. There are a number of private residential estates, office buildings, hotels and serviced apartments in this area.

History
The names of Oil Street and Shell Street come from a former oil depot that was established by Royal Dutch (now Royal Dutch Shell) in the area in 1897. The depot was decommissioned in 1981.

Features
 AIA Tower
 Former site of the Royal Hong Kong Yacht Club, at No. 12 Oil Street. The Club moved to its present location in 1938, due to land reclamation. The site is now the seat of Oi!, an organisation that aims to promote visual arts
 Newton Hotel Hong Kong
 Harbour Grand Hong Kong
 iClub Fortress Hill Hotel

Transport
The area is served by the Fortress Hill station of the MTR rapid transit railway, by the Hong Kong Tramways along King's Road and by several bus and minibus routes.

Streets include:
 King's Road
 Electric Road
 Island Eastern Corridor
 Fortress Hill Road
 Oil Street
 Shell Street
 Merlin Street

See also
 North Point Power Station
 List of places in Hong Kong

References

 
Eastern District, Hong Kong